This is a list of college men's basketball coaches by number of career wins across all three divisions of the National Collegiate Athletic Association (NCAA) and the two divisions of the National Association of Intercollegiate Athletics (NAIA). Mike Krzyzewski has the most total victories (men's or women's) with 1,202. The highest winning percentage for a men's coach with at least 600 wins is Mark Few's  at Gonzaga, where he has coached since 1999. Exhibition games and games vacated by the NCAA are not included on this list.

College basketball coaches with 600 wins

Key

Coaches

 Statistics correct through games of December 27, 2022.

See also
 List of National Basketball Association head coaches with 400 games coached
 List of college women's basketball coaches with 600 wins
 Gene Bess, junior college coach with 1,300 wins

Notes

References

 
College men's basketball records and statistics in the United States
Basketball, Men's